Robert's Web is a topical comedy show hosted by Robert Webb, broadcast in 2010. The show looks at the latest news, happenings, videos and pictures from the Internet in the last week.

Cast
 Robert Webb
 Diane Morgan
 Ben Kewin
 Joe Wilkinson
 Terry Mynott
 Eve Webster

See also
Rude Tube – a similar television series
Totally Viral – a similar television series

External links

Channel 4 comedy
2010 British television series debuts
2010s British comedy television series
2010 British television series endings
English-language television shows
Television series by All3Media